Jim Lang (1 October 1909 – 22 December 1991) was a Welsh international rugby union number 8 who played club rugby for Llanelli and Swansea. Whilst with Llanelli he faced two touring Southern Hemisphere teams, the South Africans in 1931 and New Zealand in 1935.

Rugby career
Lang was first capped for Wales in the 1931 Five Nations Championship in a game against France. Under the captaincy of Jack Bassett, Wales won the game with ease, running in seven tries. Lang was reselected two weeks later to face the Irish at Ravenhill, and when Wales won the game they also won the tournament. Lang would remain unselected for his country for another four years, but in 1931 he played for Llanelli when they hosted the touring South Africans. Lang ran out against the Springboks with his brother, Will, but ended the game on the losing side.

In 1934 Lang was back in the Welsh team, adding some experience to a team which the game earlier with 13 new caps, had lost at home to England. Led by Claude Davey and with the flair supplied by Cliff Jones, Wales beat Scotland at Murrayfield. This game was the first of ten sequential games that Lang would play for Wales stretching to 1937. His most memorable game during this period was Wales's win against the touring New Zealand team in 1935. Having already faced, and lost, to the All Blacks with Llanelli, Lang found himself selected to face the tourists for his country. It was a memorable win for Wales in a match filled with drama, that saw Wales losing with ten minutes remaining and their hooker stretchered off with a broken neck, only for the Welsh team to rally for a narrow win. Lang played his part with strong line-out play that allowed Wales to gain from good possession.

International matches played
Wales
  1935, 1936, 1937
  1931
 Ireland  1931, 1934, 1935, 1936
  1935
  1934, 1935, 1936

Bibliography

References

1909 births
1991 deaths
Llanelli RFC players
Rugby union number eights
Rugby union players from Garnant
Swansea RFC players
Wales international rugby union players
Welsh rugby union players